Barcena del Monasterio (translation: "flat place near a river, which flooded, in whole or in part, with some frequency") is a town and one of 44 civil parishes in Tineo, a municipality within the province and autonomous community of Asturias in northern Spain.

Tourism
A notable attraction is the Church of Monasterio de San Miguel ("Iglesia del Monasterio de San Miguel"), the town's 13th century monastery and attached church.

References 

Parishes in Tineo